A charity label is a label resembling a postage stamp, sold by charities to raise funds. They are generally intended to be used on mail, as a way of advertising the sender's support of the charity's cause.

Christmas Seals and Easter Seals are perhaps the two best-known types, although many kinds have been made.

While designed to look like postage stamps, they only rarely include a denomination, and never the name of a country. They are distinct from charity stamps which also include a charge for postage.

Charity labels are one of several kinds of cinderella stamp.

References 

Philatelic terminology
Cinderella stamps